Portola may refer to:
 Portola (album), a 1998 album by Rose Melberg
 Portola, California
 Portola, San Francisco, California

People with the surname
 Gaspar de Portolá (ca. 1717-aft.1784), Spanish soldier, first governor of the Californias (Baja and Alta), explorer and founder of San Diego and Monterey

See also
 Portola Hills, California
 Portola Valley, California
Portola Pharmaceuticals